Kvamsøya is an island in the municipality of Sande in Møre og Romsdal county, Norway. The island lies in the Vanylvsgapet, the entrance to the Vanylvsfjorden.

The island has been inhabited for a very long time. There have been settlements found on the island dating back to the Bronze Age. The largest population centre on the island is the village of Bringsinghaug. There is a ferry connection from Bringsinghaug to Voksa and on to Åram (in Vanylven Municipality) and then to Larsnes. The island of Kvamsøya is mountainous and has very few trees on it.

References

External links
The unofficial Kvamsøya homepage

Sande, Møre og Romsdal
Islands of Møre og Romsdal
Sunnmøre